Ruxandra Lăpușneanu (1538 – 21 November 1570) was a princess consort of Moldavia by her marriage to Alexandru Lăpușneanu in 1564. Ruxandra was the daughter of Peter IV Rareș and Princess Elena Ecaterina Rareș (the second daughter of Jovan Branković of Serbia). From 1568 until 1570 she was regent in Moldavia on behalf of her son Bogdan IV of Moldavia.

Ancestry

References

 George Marcu (coord.), Dicționarul personalităților feminine din România, Editura Meronia, București, 2009.

1538 births
1570 deaths
16th-century women rulers
16th-century Romanian people
Royal consorts of Moldavia
Rulers of Moldavia